Bruckmann's Illustrated Guides (1892-1916) were European travel guide books published by A. Bruckmann in Munich and Asher & Co. in London. The series also appeared in a German-language edition entitled Bruckmann's Illustrierte Reiseführer.

References

Further reading
In English
 
 
 
 
 

In German
 
 
 
 
 
 
 

Travel guide books
Series of books
Publications established in 1892
Books about Europe